College of Agriculture and Life Sciences is the name of several colleges at different universities that offer instruction in agriculture and the life sciences.

 The College of Agriculture and Life Sciences at the University of Arizona
 The College of Agriculture, Forestry and Life Sciences at Clemson University
 The College of Agriculture and Life Sciences at Cornell University
 The College of Agriculture and Life Sciences at the University of Florida
 The College of Agriculture and Life Sciences at the University of Idaho
 The College of Agriculture and Life Sciences at Iowa State University
 The College of Agriculture and Life Sciences at Kyungpook National University
 The College of Agriculture and Life Sciences at Mississippi State University
 The College of Agriculture and Life Sciences at North Carolina State University
 The College of Agriculture and Life Sciences at Seoul National University
 The College of Agriculture and Life Sciences at Texas A&M University
 The College of Agriculture and Life Sciences at the University of Vermont
 The College of Agriculture and Life Sciences at Virginia Tech
 The College of Agriculture and Life Sciences at the University of Wisconsin–Madison